Sparsholt may refer to:

 Sparsholt, Hampshire
 Sparsholt, Oxfordshire